Richard Emil Folz (14 January 1922 – 5 March 1973) was a politician from the U.S. state of Indiana. Between 1969 and 1973 he served as Lieutenant Governor of Indiana.

Life
Richard Folz was born in Evansville, Indiana and attended the Evansville Central High School. Later he studied at the Indiana University in Bloomington and at the Georgetown University in Washington D.C. During World War II, he served in the United States Navy as a naval aviator and became a Lieutenant (junior grade). He joined the Republican Party and in 1964 he ran unsuccessfully in the Republican Nomination for State Treasurer of Indiana. In 1967 he became treasurer of the Indiana Republican State Committee.

In 1968 he was elected to the office of the Lieutenant Governor of Indiana. He served in this position between 13 January 1969 and 8 January 1973 when his term ended. In this function he was the deputy of Governor Edgar Whitcomb and he presided over the Indiana Senate. After the end of his political career he moved to Key West, Florida, where he died only a few weeks later.

References

External links
The Political Graveyard

1922 births
1973 deaths
Lieutenant Governors of Indiana
Indiana Republicans
Indiana University Bloomington alumni
Georgetown University alumni
20th-century American naval officers
United States Naval Aviators